Jefferson David Concalo de Souza (born 27 September 1995) is a Norwegian footballer who plays as a forward for Brodd.

Career
On 6 February 2020, de Souza signed a one-year contract with Eliteserien club Viking FK. After the 2020 season, his contract expired and he left the club. On 11 March 2021, he signed for 2. divisjon club Egersund. He returned to his former club Brodd a couple of months later.

Career statistics

References

1995 births
Living people
Norwegian footballers
Norwegian people of Brazilian descent
Association football forwards
Norwegian Third Division players
Norwegian Second Division players
Norwegian Fourth Division players
Norwegian First Division players
Eliteserien players
Viking FK players
Sandnes Ulf players
Sola FK players
IL Brodd players
Nest-Sotra Fotball players
Egersunds IK players